Trigonopterus bawangensis is a species of flightless weevil in the genus Trigonopterus from Indonesia.

Etymology
The specific name is derived from that of the type locality.

Description
Individuals measure 1.90–2.48 mm in length.  The body is slightly rhomboid in shape.  General coloration is rust-colored, except for the pronotum, which is almost black.

Range

Phylogeny
T. bawangensis is part of the T. attenboroughi species group.

References

bawangensis
Beetles described in 2014
Beetles of Asia